Zhao Kang (born ) is a Chinese male  track cyclist. He competed in the Team pursuit event at the 2013 UCI Track Cycling World Championships.

References

External links
 Profile at cyclingarchives.com

1992 births
Living people
Chinese track cyclists
Chinese male cyclists
Place of birth missing (living people)
21st-century Chinese people